Cowies Creek Rail Bridge No. 1 is a bridge in Victoria, Australia, on the Geelong-Ballarat rail line in the outer Geelong suburb of Bell Post Hill. Constructed of bluestone in 1860 to cross both Cowies Creek and a roadway, the structure is listed in the Victorian Heritage Register.

References

Railway bridges in Victoria (Australia)
Victorian Heritage Register
Buildings and structures in Geelong
Heritage-listed buildings in Greater Geelong
1860 establishments in Australia
Bridges completed in 1860
Stone arch bridges in Australia